Mario Rodríguez is a Dominican Republic weightlifter. He competed in the men's heavyweight II event at the 1980 Summer Olympics.

References

Year of birth missing (living people)
Living people
Dominican Republic male weightlifters
Olympic weightlifters of the Dominican Republic
Weightlifters at the 1980 Summer Olympics
Place of birth missing (living people)
20th-century Dominican Republic people